The Catalan vault, also called thin-tile vault, Catalan turn, Catalan arch, boveda ceiling (Spanish bóveda 'vault'), or timbrel vault, is a type of low brickwork arch forming a vaulted ceiling that often supports a floor above. It is constructed by laying a first layer of light bricks lengthwise "in space", without centering or formwork, and has a much gentler curve than most other methods of construction.

Of Roman origin, it is a traditional form in regions around the Mediterranean including Catalonia (where it is widely used), and has spread around the world in more recent times through the work of Catalan architects such as Antoni Gaudí and Josep Puig i Cadafalch, and the Valencian architect Rafael Guastavino.

A study on the stability of the Catalan vault is kept at the archive of the Institute of Catalan Studies, where it is said to have been entrusted by Josep Puig i Cadafalch.

Though it is popularly called the Catalan vault, this construction method is found throughout the Mediterranean and the invention of the term "Catalan vault" occurred in 1904 at an architectural congress in Madrid.

The technique was brought to New Spain (colonial Mexico), and is still used in parts of contemporary Mexico.

In the United States 

Valencian architect and builder Rafael Guastavino introduced the technique to the United States in the 1880s, where it is called Guastavino tile. It is used in many major buildings across the United States, including the Boston Public Library, the New York Grand Central Terminal, and many others.

See also 
 List of architectural vaults

References

External links
 Ramage, Michael. "Construction of a Vault". details the process of constructing a six-foot by six-foot vault.

Architecture in Spain
Catalan architecture
Spanish Colonial architecture in Mexico
Arches and vaults
Ceilings
Brick buildings and structures
Building engineering